Riano may refer to:

Riano, Lazio, a comune (municipality) in the Province of Rome, Italy
Riaño, León, in the province of León, Spain
Riaño, a locality of the municipality of Valle de Valdebezana, Spain
Riaño, a locality of the municipality of Solórzano, Spain
Riaño de Ibio, a locality of the municipality of Mazcuerras, Spain
Riaño de Campoo, a parish in the municipality of Hermandad de Campoo de Suso, Spain
Riaño (Langreo), a parish in the municipality of Langreo, Spain